Lebbeus is a genus of shrimp in the family Thoridae. It includes a species whose name was auctioned in 2009 to raise funds for conservation; Luc Longley won with a bid of A$3,600. He named the shrimp Lebbeus clarehannah. The following species are included:

Lebbeus acudactylus Jensen, 2006
Lebbeus africanus Fransen, 1997
Lebbeus antarcticus (Hale, 1941)
Lebbeus balssi Hayashi, 1992
Lebbeus bidentatus Zarenkov, 1976
Lebbeus brandti (Bražnikov, 1907)
Lebbeus carinatus Zarenkov, 1976
Lebbeus catalepsis Jensen, 1987
Lebbeus clarehannah McCallum & Poore, 2010
Lebbeus comanthi Hayashi & Okuno, 1997
Lebbeus compressus Holthuis, 1947a
Lebbeus cristagalli McCallum & Poore, 2010
Lebbeus cristatus Ahyong, 2010
Lebbeus curvirostris Zarenkov, 1976
Lebbeus elegans Komai, Hayashi & Kohtsuka, 2004
Lebbeus eludus Jensen, 2006
Lebbeus fasciatus (Kobyakova, 1936)
Lebbeus grandimanus (Bražnikov, 1907)
Lebbeus groenlandicus (J. C. Fabricius, 1775)
Lebbeus heterochaelus (Kobyakova, 1936)
Lebbeus indicus Holthuis, 1947a
Lebbeus kuboi Hayashi, 1992
Lebbeus laevirostris Crosnier, 1999
Lebbeus lagunae (Schmitt, 1921)
Lebbeus laurentae Wicksten, 2010
Lebbeus longidactylus (Kobyakova, 1936)
Lebbeus longipes (Kobyakova, 1936)
Lebbeus manus Komai & Collins, 2009
Lebbeus microceros (Krøyer, 1841)
Lebbeus miyakei Hayashi, 1992
Lebbeus mundus Jensen, 2006
Lebbeus nudirostris Komai & Takeda, 2004
Lebbeys quadratus Chan & Komai, 2017
Lebbeus polaris (Sabine, 1824)
Lebbeus polyacanthus Komai, Hayashi & Kohtsuka, 2004
Lebbeus profundus (Rathbun, 1906)
Lebbeus rubrodentatus Bruce, 2010
Lebbeus saldanhae (Barnard, 1947)
Lebbeus schrencki (Bražnikov, 1907)
Lebbeus scrippsi Wicksten & G. Méndez, 1982
Lebbeus similior Komai & Komatsu, 2009
Lebbeus speciosus (Urita, 1942)
Lebbeus spinirostris (Kobyakova, 1936)
Lebbeus splendidus Wicksten & G. Méndez, 1982
Lebbeus spongiaris Komai, 2001
Lebbeus tosaensis Hanamura & Abe, 2003
Lebbeus unalaskensis (Rathbun, 1902)
Lebbeus ushakovi (Kobyakova, 1936)
Lebbeus vicinus (Rathbun, 1902a)
Lebbeus vinogradowi Zarenkov, 1960
Lebbeus virentova Nye et al., 2012
Lebbeus washingtonianus (Rathbun, 1902)
Lebbeus wera Ahyong, 2009
Lebbeus yaldwyni Kensley, Tranter & Griffin, 1987

References

Alpheoidea